Alessandra Giungi (born 5 May 1966) is an Italian judoka. She competed at the 1992 Summer Olympics and the 1996 Summer Olympics.

References

External links
 

1966 births
Living people
Italian female judoka
Olympic judoka of Italy
Judoka at the 1992 Summer Olympics
Judoka at the 1996 Summer Olympics
Sportspeople from Rome
20th-century Italian women
21st-century Italian women